The Executive Council of British Columbia (the Cabinet) is the Cabinet of the Canadian province of British Columbia. Almost always composed of members of the Legislative Assembly of British Columbia, the Cabinet is similar in structure and role as the federal Cabinet of Canada is to the Canadian House of Commons. 

Executive power is vested in the Crown; the lieutenant governor of British Columbia, as representative of the Crown, exercises executive power on behalf of the Cabinet, acting as the lieutenant governor in Council. Members of the Cabinet are selected by the premier of British Columbia, who chairs the Cabinet.

History
Prior to their union in 1866, the Executive Councils of the separate crown colonies of British Columbia and Vancouver Island were largely appointed by the governor and included military and judicial officials, their role that of the governor's cabinet, similar to the present except that the governor took part in cabinet meetings and political decisions, whereas the modern-day lieutenant governor does not. The colonial Legislative Assemblies were subordinate to the governor and the Council and served more as a sounding-board than a legislative body.

Cabinet

The current Cabinet consists of members of the Legislative Assembly representing the province's governing party, the British Columbia New Democratic Party. David Eby was sworn in as premier of British Columbia by Lieutenant Governor Janet Austin on November 18, 2022. His initial cabinet was sworn in on December 7, 2022.

List of historical cabinets
W.A.C. Bennett ministry (1952–1972)
Barrett ministry (1972–1975)
Bill Bennett ministry (1975–1986)
Vander Zalm ministry (1986–1991)
Johnston ministry (1991)
Harcourt ministry (1991–1996)
Glen Clark ministry (1996–1999)
Miller ministry (1999–2000)
Dosanjh ministry (2000–2001)
Campbell ministry (2001–2011)
Christy Clark ministry (2011–2017)
Horgan ministry (2017–2022)

References